Hans Georg Nenning (born February 20, 1946) is an Austrian actor, author and director.

Early life and education
Born in Graz on February 20, 1946, he grew up in a well situated family with an academic background. His father Dr. Hans Weingraber was a medical doctor, his mother Edith née Kainer a psychology student. During her second marriage to the journalist Günther Nenning, the name was changed to Hans Georg Nenning.
In 1959, Hans Georg Nenning moved with his parents to Vienna. After secondary school and doing military service he decided to become an actor. He studied at the Max Reinhardt Seminar in Vienna and made his debut on the stage of the Burgtheater. Theatre Engagements in “Die Komödianten”, Stadttheater Ulm, Volkstheater, Theater in der Josefstadt, Stadttheater Salzburg have come next.

Career
Nenning appears in numerous film and television productions.
For the European television production ”EUROCOPS” he wrote the episode "Transit to Death" and played one of the leads therein . He was also acting in the US serial ”BAND OF BROTHERS”,  part nine: ”Why We Fight”, directed by David Frankel and produced by Tom Hanks and Steven Spielberg for HBO.
In 2007 he made his directorial debut, and shot in Paris his first Short “DUSK”.
In 2011, Hans Georg Nenning also became a novelist, publishing the collection BEYOND THE LIGHT – Reports from the Future.
In 2014, he published the end-time thriller FADING AWAY,  in 2015 the novel FROZEN LIGHT, in 2017 the science fiction novel CASCADE - The Mission  and in 2018 the novel CASCADE - Dormir

References

External links
 
 official website
 The European Independent Film Festival

Austrian male television actors
Austrian male stage actors
Austrian male film actors
Male actors from Vienna
Actors from Graz
21st-century Austrian male actors
20th-century Austrian male actors
Living people
1946 births